Lucy Caroline Noakes  (born 1964) is a British historian. Since 2017, she has been Rab Butler Professor of Modern History at the University of Essex.

Biography 
Noakes has said that she became interested in history through left-wing politics; she was inspired by E. P. Thompson's speeches at CND rallies and by his book The Making of the English Working Class to uncover the lives of ordinary people, especially women (owing to the influence of feminist historians like Sheila Rowbotham). She completed a Bachelor of Arts (BA) degree at the University of Sussex and stayed there to complete a Doctor of Philosophy (DPhil) degree, which was awarded in 1996 for her thesis Gender and British National Identity in Wartime: A Study of the Links Between Gender and National Identity in Britain in the Second World War, the Falklands War, and the Gulf War.

After her doctorate, Noakes worked at Southampton Solent University and the University of Portsmouth, before joining the University of Brighton in 2007, where she eventually became Reader in Social and Cultural History. In 2017, Noakes was appointed Rab Butler Professor of Modern History at the University of Essex. As of 2014, she is a Fellow of the Royal Historical Society.

Research 
Noakes's research has focused on war, memory, gender and national identity in modern Britain, in particular on the experiences and memories of people who were involved in First and Second World War, as well as gendered identities in wartime, and on women's experiences of war. Her publications include:

 Books
 (With Sasha Handley and Rohan McWilliam) New Directions in Social and Cultural History (Bloomsbury, 2017) 
 (With Juliette Pattinson) British Cultural Memory and the Second World War (Bloomsbury, 2013). 
Women in the British Army: War and the 'Gentle Sex', 1907–1948 (Routledge, 2008) 
 War and the British: Gender and National Identity, 1939–1991 (I.B. Tauris, 1997). 

 Articles and book chapters

 (with Maggie Andrews, Alison Fell and June Purvis) "Representing, Remembering and Rewriting Women's Histories of the First World War", Women's History Review (2017).
 "'My Husband is Interested in War Generally': gender, family history and the emotional legacies of total war", Women's History Review (2017).
 "A broken silence? Mass Observation, Armistice Day and 'everyday life' in Britain 1937–1941", Journal of European Studies, vol. 45, no. 4 (2015).
 "Gender, Grief, and Bereavement in Second World War Britain", Journal of War and Culture Studies, vol. 8, no. 1 (2015).
 (with Juliette Pattinson and Wendy Ugolini), "Incarcerated Masculinities: Male POWs and the Second World War", Journal of War and Culture Studies, vol. 7, no. 3 (2014).
 "'War on the Web': The BBC 'People's War' Website and Memories of the Second World War in 21st century Britain", in Lucy Noakes and Juliette Pattinson, British Cultural Memory and the Second World War (2013). 
 "Defending the home(land): gendering Civil Defence from the First World War to the 'War on Terror'. Gender and Conflict since 1914", in Ana Carden-Coyne (ed.), Historical and Interdisciplinary Perspectives. Gender and Conflict since 1914 (2012), pp. 53–70. 
 "'Serve to Save': Gender, Citizenship and Civil Defence in Britain 1937–41", Journal of Contemporary History, vol. 47, no. 4 (2012).
 "From War Service to Domestic Service: Ex-Servicewomen and the Free Passage Scheme 1919-22", Twentieth Century British History, vol. 22, no. 1 (2011).
 "Demobilising the Military Woman: Constructions of Class and Gender in Britain after the First World War", Gender and History, vol. 19, no. 1 (2007).
 "Eve in Khaki: Women Working with the British Military 1915–1918", in Louise Jackson (ed.), Women and Work Culture: Britain c. 1850–1950 (2005), pp. 213–228.

References

External links 
 

1964 births
Living people
British historians
Alumni of the University of Sussex
Academics of Solent University
Academics of the University of Portsmouth
Academics of the University of Brighton
Academics of the University of Essex